Phil Hoy may refer to:

 Phil Hoy (politician) (born 1937), former Democratic member of the Indiana House of Representatives
 Phil Hoy (rugby union) (born 1987), English rugby union player